Bowling took place for the men's and women's individual, doubles, trios, and team events at the 1986 Asian Games in Dong Seoul Grand Bowling Center, Seoul, South Korea from September 26 to October 1.

Medalists

Men

Women

Medal table

References

Medalists

External links
 Olympic Council of Asia

 
1986 Asian Games events
1986
Asian Games
1986 Asian Games